Manodeb Sinha is an Indian Politician from the state of West Bengal. He is a  member of the West Bengal Legislative Assembly.

Career 
He is a member of All India Trinamool Congress. He represents the Karandighi (Vidhan Sabha constituency).

References 

Living people
Trinamool Congress politicians from West Bengal
Year of birth missing (living people)
West Bengal MLAs 2016–2021